Vancouver International Airport  is an international airport located on Sea Island in Richmond, British Columbia, serving the city of Vancouver and the Lower Mainland region. It is the second busiest airport in Canada by passenger traffic (19.0 million), behind Toronto Pearson International Airport, and the second busiest airport in the Pacific Northwest region, behind Seattle–Tacoma International Airport. As a trans-Pacific hub, the airport has more direct flights to China than any other airport in North America or Europe. It is a hub for Air Canada and WestJet, and an operating base for Air Transat. Vancouver International Airport is one of eight Canadian airports that have US Border Pre-clearance facilities. It is also one of the few major international airports to have a terminal for scheduled floatplanes.

The airport has won several notable international best airport awards. It won the Skytrax Best North American Airport award in 2007 and 2010 through 2022, for a record of 12 consecutive years. The airport also made the top 10 list of airports in the world for the first time in 2012, rated at 9th (2012), 8th (2013), and 9th (2014) overall. It is the only North American airport included in the top 10 for 2013 and 2014. YVR also retains the distinction of Best Canadian Airport in the regional results.

Vancouver International Airport is located on Sea Island and is managed by Vancouver Airport Authority, a non-profit organization.

History
In 1929, the City of Vancouver purchased land located on Sea Island to be used for aviation purposes, replacing the original grass airstrip at Minoru Park on Lulu Island. During World War II, the airport and its original terminal, now the South Terminal, were leased to the federal government and operated by the Department of National Defence and the Department of Transport as RCAF Station Sea Island. The airport was used for the British Commonwealth Air Training Plan. The crews and their families were housed in a new townsite on the island, named Burkeville, after Boeing president Stanley Burke. Funds from the lease were used to purchase additional land for new hangars and a production plant for Boeing Aircraft of Canada (now Boeing Canada).

The present main terminal was completed in 1968 and has since been expanded to include separate domestic and international terminals. A north runway was completed in 1996.

In 2011, the airport announced that it will enact a program aiming to encourage airlines to start more flights between Vancouver and Asia. As of 2022, the program has succeeded in many of its goals.

The airport has often been described as a major trans-Pacific hub, due to its location in the Pacific Northwest and destinations in the Americas, Asia, and Australia, which help facilitate connecting flights. In 2019, Craig Richmond, President and CEO of the Vancouver Airport Authority, said that the recent growth of Seattle–Tacoma International Airport in the United States could challenge Vancouver's status as a trans-Pacific hub, although Seattle–Tacoma is already the larger airport.

Terminals

Vancouver International Airport has two terminals: the Main Terminal, and the South Terminal. The Main Terminal contains Domestic and International concourses. Free Wi-Fi is available in all sections of the airport. Throughout the terminal, there is trilingual English, French, and Chinese signage. The South Terminal, along with the adjacent floatplane docks, is referred to by airport management as "Airport South".

Domestic Concourse 
The Domestic section of the terminal was constructed in 1968 by the Vancouver-based firm Thompson, Berwick and Pratt and was given a top-to-bottom renovation in 2005 by Vancouver architect Kasian Kennedy. The Domestic area consists of three piers (A-C).

Pier A 
Pier A consists of 6 gates: A6 through A10 and A12. These gates are used by WestJet Encore.

Pier B 
Pier B consists of 14 gates: gates B13 through B23 and B26 through B28. Gates B14 to B17 allow international arrivals. Gate B23 is a ground loading ramp accessing stands 23A, 23B, and 23C. Pier B is the hub for domestic flights for WestJet, and additionally serves domestic flights by Air North, Air Transat, Flair Airlines, Lynx Air and Sunwing Airlines.

Pier C 
Pier C consists of 24 gates: C29 through C52. This is the hub for Air Canada and Air Canada Express domestic flights. C50, C51 and C52 are swing gates and can be used for international arrivals and departures (designated as D50 to D52). Gates C48 and C49 can also receive international/US arrivals.

International Concourse 
The International Concourse was designed by Vancouver-based Architectura, now Stantec, with Kansas City-based HNTB Corporation (1994–96). YVR is one of eight Canadian airports with United States border preclearance facilities, which are situated in the International Terminal. All international concourse gates can accept flights arriving from international and US origins; passengers are directed onto overhead walkways which lead to the Canada Border Services Agency screening area.

Pier D 

Pier D consists of 29 gates and is used by all international-bound and select US-bound flights from Vancouver. There are 29 gates: D50 to D78. D56, D57, D59, D60, D61, D63, and D65 are bus gates for remote stands. All gates can handle wide-body aircraft; seven gates are fitted with 2 jet bridges, six of these gates can handle the Airbus A380. British Airways operates the A380 seasonally to Vancouver; however, the airline plans to permanently cease A380 from YVR effective September 26, 2022. The pier has been expanded to the west to allow for more gates and more remote stand operations. D50 to D52 are swing gates that can be used by domestic flights (designated C50 to C52). D71 through D75 are swing gates which may be partitioned off to allow for a higher number of United States border preclearance flights (designated E73 through E75) and are used as contingency gates for international flights.

A SkyTeam airport lounge operated by Global Lounge Network is located near gate D53 and the Air Canada Maple Leaf Lounge is at Gate D52.

Pier E 

Pier E is the US border preclearance area and consists of 20 gates: E73 to E88 and E90 to E96. Gates E73 to E78 can accommodate smaller wide-body aircraft and are swing gates which used to be used for international departures (as gates D75 to D78). Gate E85 is a bus gate for remote stands. Gate E95 accesses ground-loading stands 95A and 95B.

The majority of US-bound flights operate from Pier E; the only exceptions are flights from the international origin and flights that depart after 8:30 p.m. (mainly seasonal eastbound red-eye flights).

Airport South
The Airport South complex includes the South Terminal, the Floatplane Facility and other adjacent operations.

South Terminal
The South Terminal is a portion of the original pre-1968 terminal which is still in use. It also houses the corporate headquarters and main base of Pacific Coastal Airlines and Harbour Air.

The South Terminal serves regional airlines which fly mostly within British Columbia, such as Pacific Coastal Airlines and Central Mountain Air, in addition to chartered flights. A nearby building serves as the YVR terminal for Helijet.

Floatplane facility
The Vancouver International Water Airport  is located on Inglis Drive, a short distance from the South Terminal. This facility allows floatplanes to land and dock on the South Arm of the Fraser River. The facility is served by all floatplane operators other than Harbour Air, which maintains a separate dock and terminal at the Flying Beaver Bar and Grill nearby.

Airlines and destinations

Passenger

Cargo

Statistics

Annual traffic

Ground transportation

Rapid transit (SkyTrain)

The airport has a station on the SkyTrain network called YVR–Airport, the terminus of the Sea Island branch of the Canada Line. As part of the Canada Line's funding, the airport authority contributed $300 million towards construction. A pedestrian footbridge ($117 million, completed in 2007) links the international terminal with the domestic terminal and serves as the arrival and departure area for users of the Canada Line. The Canada Line itself opened in August 2009 as the third line of Vancouver's rapid transit network, in advance of the 2010 Winter Olympics which took place the following February. It was the only airport rail link service of any kind in Canada until the opening of Toronto's Union Pearson Express in 2015.

Bus
When Canada Line service is interrupted, such as overnight or other service disruptions, the N10 night bus operated by Coast Mountain Bus Company (under contract to TransLink) connects the airport's international and domestic terminals to Richmond and downtown Vancouver. The airport's south terminal is served by the 412 bus, which connects to the Canada Line at Bridgeport Station. Between 2001 and the Canada Line's opening in 2009, regular bus service was provided by TransLink route 424.

Coach to Whistler, Squamish, and Victoria 
YVR Skylynx is an official partner of YVR Vancouver Airport.

YVR Skylynx buses to Whistler run directly from YVR Vancouver Airport and Vancouver City Centre to Squamish, Creekside Village, and Whistler using up to 16 services a day. YVR Skylynx also operates daily services to Victoria from YVR Vancouver Airport via BC Ferries Tsawwassen to Swartz Bay route.

Expansion

In preparation for the Vancouver 2010 Winter Olympic Games, YVR completed a $1.4-billion multi-year capital development plan, which included a four-gate expansion to the International Terminal Wing, completed in June 2007. Two of the four new gates are conventional wide-bodied gates and two can accommodate the Airbus A380. The international terminal addition includes interior design elements intended to represent British Columbia, including a stream in a pathway and fish and jellyfish tanks.

A five-gate and food and retail expansion were completed in 2009 for Domestic Terminal's C-Pier. The train that links downtown Vancouver, YVR, and Richmond opened in August 2009.

Vancouver International Airport Authority has developed a 2017–2037 Master Plan, called Flight Plan 2037 which includes 75 projects at a projected cost of $5.6 billion. The plan allows for the airport to serve 35 million passengers by 2037. The plan calls for the expansion of facilities around the existing large terminal. New piers and gates will be added, as well as a second parking garage, taxiways, and improved vehicle access. A new runway may also be constructed. Eight additional gates at the international terminal were added in the first phase which was completed in February 2021. Final approval of the plan by the Ministry of Transport is needed.

Distinctives

Architecture

YVR's interior has a uniquely British Columbian theme, featuring an extensive collection of Pacific Northwest Coast Native art, and blues and greens to reflect the colours of the land, sea, and sky. This theme was designed by Vancouver-based firm Architectura. The airport uses a great deal of carpet and vast expanses of glass to let in large amounts of natural light. One of the most noticeable places for an arriving passenger is the International arrivals hall, a large area where customs and immigration procedures are completed. Arriving passengers come down escalators leading to a platform across a large waterfall.

In 2020, the expansion of International Pier D was completed with a glassed-in island forest with access to the outdoors and an immersive digital experience that explores the rugged British Columbia Coast.

Art 
The YVR aboriginal art collection includes wooden sculptures and totem poles. Bill Reid's sculpture in bronze, "The Spirit of Haida Gwaii, The Jade Canoe", is displayed in the international departures area. This is the second of two castings of this sculpture; the first casting, "The Spirit of Haida Gwaii, The Black Canoe", is now displayed outside the Canadian Embassy in Washington, D.C. The Pacific Passage area includes artwork by Stan Wamiss and Connie Watts. The Institute for Stained Glass in Canada has documented the stained glass at Vancouver International Airport.

Accessibility

Since 1992, Vancouver Airport Authority has been working with an independent accessibility consultant to eliminate the physical barriers in the built environment and is "committed to providing fully accessible terminal facilities for people of all backgrounds and capabilities".

In 2004, the airport received the Rick Hansen Accessibility Award, which recognizes "facilities and communities that improve the quality of life for people with mobility limitations".

Designated short-term parking spaces and curb-side ramps are available on each level of the terminal building for vehicles displaying a valid SPARC permit and are located next to main doors near check-in counters and baggage claim areas for easier access. Lowered counters with toe clearance for wheelchair users are also available at check-in, customer care, and all retail outlets in Vancouver Airport. Bathrooms have also been designed to be wheelchair-accessible with doorless and no-touch entry features, lowered sinks, and hands-free bathroom dispensers. Grab bars and emergency call buttons are also present in all wheelchair-accessible toilet stalls.

Low-resistance carpeting and other materials such as laminate flooring have been utilized throughout the airport to make it easier for people using wheelchairs and walkers to move throughout the airport. Elevators are large and allow for easy turning in a wheelchair and special wheelchairs designed to fit down aircraft aisles are utilized to assist with boarding and de-planing. Wheelchair lifts have been installed at aircraft gates to provide disabled passengers with their wheelchairs as quickly as possible after an aircraft lands in Vancouver.

Features that have been implemented throughout the airport to aid those with hearing loss include a public address system to reduce noise pollution for those with hearing aids. Vancouver International Airport has installed more individual speakers in a given space than is standard, which allows the volume of the speakers to be turned down and provides a better quality of sound. At check-in counters, amplified handsets are available to aid those with hearing aids, and all telephones throughout the airport have adjustable volume controls. "Visual pagers" are dedicated video monitors that are located throughout the airport and convey important information to travellers that have hearing impairments. In the event of an emergency, a video override system displays large bold messages on all entertainment systems and provides information about the type of emergency and the required course of action from the public. Strobe fire alarms have also been installed throughout the airport and have been carefully programmed to prevent seizures to those with epilepsy. Vancouver Airport has its TTY telephone number for incoming inquiries about airport operations and within the terminal, there are also 23 public telephones equipped with TTY at both stand-up and seated positions.

Vancouver International Airport also has numerous features that have been implemented to assist visually impaired travellers. Three types of flooring are utilized throughout the terminal and function as a texturized guide to assist travellers in identifying their location within the airport. In areas with tile or terrazzo, patterns in the tile help to identify exits. Areas that have carpet help to identify that a gate is close by and areas with laminate flooring indicate retail spaces. Tactile maps are also available at customer service counters throughout the airport, and braille and tactile lettering are used throughout the airport to indicate building features such as washrooms.

Green Coat Ambassadors
Vancouver Airport Authority was one of the first airports in North America to institute a volunteer program in 1989. Volunteers in green vest/jacket are deployed around the airport to provide information, customer service and be the 'eyes and ears' for the various partners in the airport community between the hours of 6am to 10pm every day. Volunteers are given basic training in airport operations and undertake many of the similar trainings mandated to airport employees. Each volunteer is required to obtain Transportation Security Clearance and Restricted Area Identification Card to access the restricted and sterile areas of the terminal.

YVR Sustainability

Operation Yellow Ribbon

As a result of the September 11 attacks, the airspace over the United States was shut down. Aircraft over the North Atlantic and Pacific bound for the United States were therefore diverted to Canadian airports.Vancouver International Airport accommodated 34 of these flights (3rd highest after Halifax and Gander) amounting to a total of 8,500 passengers.

The airport won the 2001 Airport Management Award from the B.C. Aviation Council and was cited for overcoming many challenges in a professional and compassionate way.

Emergency Services

Vancouver International Airport Emergency Services Team is the primary fire services at the airport. The airport fire station and tenders (4) are owned by the Vancouver Airport Authority. Richmond Fire has additional resources when required from Richmond Fire Hall #4 (Sea Island) at 3900 Russ Baker Way, as well as the Canadian Coast Guard.

Policing at the airport is provided by the Royal Canadian Mounted Police Richmond detachment. Airport emergency health services are provided by the British Columbia Ambulance Service, with Station 270 providing a dedicated bike squad for rapid EMS response to passengers and staff. In addition, BCAS air ambulance Station 280 is located near the YVR South Terminal, providing air ambulance service with two Sikorsky S-76 helicopters, two Beechcraft Super King Air turboprop aircraft, and one Cessna Citation Bravo jet.

Accidents and incidents
On February 7, 1968, a Canadian Pacific Airlines Boeing 707 overran a runway and hit a building, while landing in heavy fog, killing one crew member.
On March 1, 1970, Vickers Viscount CF-THY of Air Canada collided in mid-air with an Ercoupe 415 CF-SHN on approach to Vancouver International Airport. The Ercoupe pilot was killed.
On June 23, 1985, two pieces of unauthorized luggage containing bombs were checked in at the airport and loaded onto Canadian Pacific Airlines Flight 60 to Toronto and Canadian Pacific Airlines Flight 3 to Tokyo respectively. Upon exploding, the former killed all 329 on board Air India Flight 182, and the latter, intended for Air India Flight 301, exploded at Tokyo Narita International Airport, killing two baggage handlers.
On August 19, 1995, Douglas C-47B (DC-3) C-GZOF of Air North crashed during an emergency return to the airport, killing one of the three crew. The aircraft was on a ferry flight to Prince Rupert Airport when the starboard propeller went into overspeed and the decision was made to return to Vancouver International.
On October 19, 1995, a Canadian Airlines McDonnell Douglas DC-10 aborted takeoff on runway 26 (now 26L) two seconds after the V1 call. The aircraft ended up in the soft ground west of the end of runway, causing the failure of the nose gear. All 243 passengers and 14 crew escaped with no more than minor injuries.
On September 11, 2001, an Air China Boeing 747 from Beijing to San Francisco, was escorted by two U.S. F-15s onto the airport's north runway during Operation Yellow Ribbon, apparently due to a communication problem.
On October 14, 2007, a Polish immigrant, Robert Dziekanski, died after being shot with a taser by the Royal Canadian Mounted Police at the airport. Dziekański, who did not speak English, became agitated after waiting approximately 10 hours at the arrivals hall because he could not find his mother. While police were attempting to take Dziekanski into custody he was tased by officers and subsequently died. The subsequent Braidwood Inquiry began in May 2008. In June 2010, the judge found that the use of the taser was not justified. The RCMP issued an apology to Dziekanski's mother. The commission also found that tasers have the capability to injure or kill by causing heart irregularities, especially where the individual is medically or emotionally compromised.
 On October 19, 2007, at approximately 4:10pm, a Piper Seneca bound for Pitt Meadows Airport took off from YVR and crashed into a nearby apartment building in Richmond. The pilot was the sole occupant of the plane. He was killed in the crash. Two others were injured, both of whom were in the apartment building at the time.
 On September 18, 2008, in the afternoon, an Air Canada Airbus A340 collided with an Air Canada Jazz Dash 8 aircraft. The Jazz flight was taxiing on the runway when it collided. The Air Canada flight was bound for Hong Kong. Both aircraft received damage but there were no injuries or fatalities.
 On July 9, 2009, at approximately 10:08pm, a Piper Navajo airplane originating from Victoria crashed into an industrial area in Richmond, British Columbia. The two pilots were killed. It was owned and operated by Canadian Air Charters and was carrying units of blood for Canadian Blood Services at the time. Officials say that wake turbulence was the main cause of the crash. Fatigue, along with diminished depth perception in darkness, was also a factor.
There were seven passengers and two crew members on board; only the pilot was confirmed dead at 9:00pm that evening, while the others survived with various injuries. Two on the ground were also injured. On November 16, 2011, the co-pilot of the flight died in hospital.
 On May 9, 2021, a 28-year-old man was fatally shot outside the international terminal. The Integrated Homicide Investigation Team said the shooting was targeted and linked to ongoing Lower Mainland gang conflict in Metro Vancouver. Richmond RCMP pursued a suspect vehicle from the terminal to Lulu Island, where the suspects reportedly shot at police. The vehicle was later found burned-out in Surrey.

Nearby major airports

References

Citations

General

External links 

 
 Vancouver International Airport page on Places to Fly, the airport directory of the Canadian Owners and Pilots Association
 Vancouver International Airport Authority Union

1931 establishments in British Columbia
Airports established in 1931
Airports in Greater Vancouver
Buildings and structures in Richmond, British Columbia
Canadian airports with United States border preclearance
Certified airports in British Columbia
National Airports System
Sea Island (British Columbia)
Transport in Richmond, British Columbia